Isa TKM (Isa Te Quiero Mucho) is an original telenovela-like teen program from Nickelodeon Latin America in co-production with Sony Pictures Television, Made in Venezuela being the second from three Latin American Nickelodeon programs (The first one was Skimo from Mexico and the third one being La maga y el camino dorado, made in Argentina).

Plot summary 
"Isabella "Isa" Pasqualli" is a 15-year-old girl who lives in Caracas, Venezuela. Her dream is to win the heart of Alejandro "Alex" Ruiz ; but this dream is a challenge, since Cristina Ricalde "Cristarántula", her rival, catches Alex's eye.

Isa's best friend is named Linda Luna "Gordi linda" and she has the same dilemma that Isa has—she's in love with a boy named Reinaldo Galán "Rey" but his heart belongs to Cristina.

Alex and Rey are rivals in the school because they are competing against each other in a band contest that the school will have.

Cristina is the daughter of the owner of "Ricalde" bank; and her sister, Rebeca Ricalde, is the rival of Marina Pasquali, Isa's sister.

Isa's sister, is engaged to Cristóbal Silva, whom both Rebeca and Marina love. Rebecca has the advantage, since Cristóbal's mother, Lucrecia Portocarreros, is friend of Rebecca's money and she supports her in everything she can.

Cristóbal's brother Micky is Alex's best friend and in his band, and his girlfriend is Vanessa, friend of Cristina (although soon Justa becomes his girlfriend because Vanessa gets out of school).

Alex's mother, Estela, is in love with the Cristóbal's and Micky's cousin Julio, but he is still in love with his teenage girlfriend Jennifer Contreras, with whom he had a daughter.

Isa's parents, Antonio and Carmina Pasqualli, are owners of a pizzería that is located in the same building where Isa, Alex, Linda, Rey, Micky and Cristóbal, and Marina live.

Eventually, Isa becomes Alex's girlfriend, and discovers that she is adopted and that her biological parents are Julio and Jennifer.  Initially, Isa does not accept to her biological parents but eventually she ends up loving them.

Marina and Cristóbal separated after their marriage and decided to go separate ways. This was the result of Rebecca.

Also you see how Carlitos, Isa's friend, was attracted to her, but when he changes his look, Ruby (one of Cristina's friends) begins to like him.  Ruby leaves school, so Carlitos begins to flirt with Justa's twin sister Norma, and they become a couple shortly before the recording of a music video (which is ruined by Cristina).

At the end of this season, Dago Julian in love with Isa and one of the most famous D.J's, leaves his feelings aside and tries to reunite Isa and Alex.

Cristina becomes friendly with all and she also tries to reconcile them.

Carlitos and Norma are still together and so are Micky and Justa.

Linda and Rey become a couple, and Marina begins a romance with one of Isa's producers named Raul Clavati.

Episodes

See also 
Isa TK+
Skimo
Sueña conmigo
This article contains content translated from Spanish Wikipedia. You can visit it and finish the translation.

External links 
Official site (in spanish)
Official MySpace profile (in spanish)
Isa TKM on MTV Tr3s (in spanglish)

 
Venezuelan telenovelas
2008 telenovelas
2008 Venezuelan television series debuts
2010 Venezuelan television series endings
Spanish-language telenovelas
Musical telenovelas
Children's telenovelas
Spanish-language Nickelodeon original programming
Television series by Teleset
Television series about teenagers
Nickelodeon telenovelas
Sony Pictures Television telenovelas